"Do What You Wanna Do" is the debut 1977 single by Nassau, Bahamas based group, T-Connection. The single reached number one on the disco/dance chart in the US for seven weeks. The single made it to #15 on the soul charts and peaked at #46 on the US pop chart.

References

1977 debut singles
1977 songs
Disco songs